Charles Henry Stearns (February 7, 1854 – October 12, 1936) was a businessman and politician who served as 45th lieutenant governor of Vermont for one term.

Early life
Charles Henry Stearns was born in Johnson, Vermont on February 7, 1854.  He was educated in Johnson and graduated from the State Normal School (later Johnson State College and now Northern Vermont University) and Vermont Seminary in Montpelier.

Business career
Stearns joined his family's business manufacturing butter tubs and other wood products, and eventually expanded the company into other areas of the lumber business, including logging lands in Canada.  He also became active in other enterprises, including a dry goods store and a granite quarry and stone products business.  He also served as a Director and President of the Union Bank and Trust Company of Morrisville.

Political career
Stearns was active in government and politics, including service as Chairman of the Lamoille County Republican Committee, and Johnson Town Treasurer.  He was elected to the Vermont House of Representatives from 1886 to 1888 and the Vermont Senate from 1898 to 1890. In 1904 he was elected Lieutenant Governor, serving until 1906.

Death and burial
Stearns died in Medfield, Massachusetts on October 12, 1936. He was buried in Johnson's Lamoille View Cemetery.

Family
In 1876, Stearns married Viola A. Hall of Johnson.  They were the parents of a son, C. Arthur Stearns.

Legacy
C. H. Stearns Company is still active in Johnson as a convenience store and gas station, and one of his partnerships, Parker and Stearns, still operates as a construction supply and equipment business.

Stearns Hall at Johnson State College is named for him.

References 

1854 births
1936 deaths
Johnson State College alumni
Republican Party members of the Vermont House of Representatives
Republican Party Vermont state senators
Lieutenant Governors of Vermont
People from Johnson, Vermont
Burials in Vermont